The following lists events that happened during 2000 in Bosnia and Herzegovina.

Incumbents
Presidency:
Alija Izetbegović (until October 14), Halid Genjac (starting October 14)
Ante Jelavić
Živko Radišić
Prime Minister: 
 until June 6: Haris Silajdžić 
 June 6-October 18: Spasoje Tuševljak 
 starting October 18: Martin Raguž

Events

November
 November 11 - Bosnian parliamentary election, 2000

References

 
Years of the 20th century in Bosnia and Herzegovina
2000s in Bosnia and Herzegovina
Bosnia and Herzegovina
Bosnia and Herzegovina